Ivo Ergović (born 24 December 1967) is a Croatian retired footballer who played as a defensive midfielder and made one appearance for the Croatia national team.

International career
Ergović earned his first and only cap for Croatia on 8 June 1997 in the Kirin Cup against Japan. He came on as a half-time substitute for Dubravko Pavličić in the away match, which was played in Tokyo and finished as a 3–4 loss.

Career statistics

International

References

External links
 
 
 
 

1967 births
Living people
Footballers from Osijek
Association football midfielders
Yugoslav footballers
Croatian footballers
Croatia international footballers
NK Belišće players
NK Osijek players
FC Red Bull Salzburg players
Yugoslav First League players
Austrian Football Bundesliga players
Croatian Football League players
Croatian expatriate footballers
Expatriate footballers in Austria
Croatian expatriate sportspeople in Austria